Ahaṁkāra (Sanskrit: अहंकार), 'I-making' is a Sanskrit term in Saṃkhyā philosophy that refers to the identification of Self or Being with 'Nature' or any impermanent 'thing'. It is referred to as ego and evolves from Mahat-tattva, It is one of the four Antaḥkaraṇa (functions of the mind).

Reference in Bhagavad Gita 
Ahaṁkāra is one of the four parts of the Antahkarana (inner organ) described in Vedanta; the other three parts include Buddhi, Citta, and Manas. In the Uttara Mimamsa or Vedanta branch of Hindu philosophy, though not extensively discussed in the Bhagavad Gita, Krishna informs Arjuna that Ahaṁkāra, be removed. Krishna mentions that "Air, water, earth, fire, sky, mind, intelligence and ahankara (ego) together constitute the nature created by me." In other words, Ahaṁkāra must subordinate to the Lord. The reasoning provided was that since the self is not (cannot be) perceived when one is in a state of Ahaṁkāra, effaced, it should be.

Philosophical implications 

Vedic philosophy also teaches that when one's mind is in a state of Ahaṁkāra, one is in a state of subjective illusion where the psyche is bound to the concept of one's self with an external thing. This thing can be tangible and material, or it can be a concept, such as the concept of the fight for peace. Here, the ego is involved in constructing the illusion.

Examples of Ahaṃkāra in action:

Consider how an otherwise sensible young man might feel if his new sports car was a reflection of his true self. It would encourage him to race against another person recklessly. Similarly, consider how someone who believed in the fight for peace and ordinarily behaved in a non-violent manner fought against someone who threatened or challenged their notions of peace.

In both cases, the mind has averred a state of illusion, appearing real to the person who blurs the line between subjectivity and reality. This illusory state often causes people to do things that can be categorized as "out of character" for them.

Ahaṁkāra and Spiritual Development 

 Ahaṁkāra is the instrument of Ahaṃ (the Spirit), the principle of individuation, acting as an independent conscious entity within the impure reality which does not have consciousness of its own.
 Ahaṁkāra is (actually soul/ego-soul) the instrument of the spirit (made by thought-material—dark energy' and 'dark material') for the individual development of the ego-soul, like DEHA (material-body/mold), which is the instrument for solitary evolution of the ego-soul/mind.
 It is a receptacle of Cit śakti, its consciousness, a diminutive spark from Cit, the universal consciousness.
 It manifests itself by assuming authorship of all the actions of buddhi, manas, the senses, and organs of action.
 It is believed to exist in the sphere of duality—in a state of identification with the physical body, its needs and desires.
 It is related to Vak tattva, one of the 36 tattvas in Vedic and Hindu philosophy.
 In Ahaṁkāra, a state of rajas guṇa (agitation) predominates. This is because it identifies only with a small part of the creation (the body) and rejects everything else as "not me"; it becomes subject to a series of afflictions such as pride, egoism, competitiveness, hate, and jealousy.

Though Ahaṁkāra is generally a state of illusion, Vak tattva (one of the 36 tattvas) can appear when one does not succumb to it. In Vak tattva, the individual’s will, determination, sense of morality and ethics come into play, which is the first step on the path to spiritual development or even, enlightenment. However, a person who is sufficiently harmonious but has a powerful Ahaṁkāra (personality) is thought to be impossible to exert the level of effort necessary to accede to a higher spiritual level.

Ahaṁkāra and Buddhi 
According to evolutionary chain described in Samkhya, the evolution process begins with Mahattattva, followed first by buddhi, and then ahaṁkāra. The position of Ahaṁkāra and buddhi are sometimes presented in a reversed order because, as the principle of "I-ness", the Ahaṁkāra is allowed control over the manas (sensorial mind) and buddhi (superior intellect, intuition). Yet, buddhi is a superior tattva, and Ahaṁkāra is thus only able to be in a superior position to buddhi from a functional point of view. From an absolute point of view, Ahaṁkāra is created by buddhi and thus subordinate to it.

See also
 Antahkarana (Inner Cause)
 Chod (To Sever)
 Cognitive dissonance 
 Anatta
 Ego death
 Egolessness
 Humility
 Mindstream
 Shadripu
 Svabhava
 Ramana Maharshi
 I Am a Strange Loop
 Self-concept

Jainism
 Ahankar (Pride)

References

External links
 The Knot of the Heart

Hindu philosophical concepts